Winifred's warbler (Scepomycter winifredae), also known as Mrs. Moreau's warbler, is a species of bird in the family Cisticolidae. The species was first recorded and named by the ornithologist Reginald Moreau after his wife.

The species was originally described in the genus Artisornis based on an immature male specimen. The species was found in the Kinole forest north of Uluguru in eastern Tanzania. The bird is mostly olive green above with the forehead and crown being rufous brown as are the sides of the head and chest. The chin is whitish.

Moreau later moved it to the genus Scepomycter after examining museum specimens and obtaining new specimens of adults through his collector Charles Abdallah who lured the specimens by imitating the low whistles of a Malaconotus. The genus Scepomycter was traditionally considered monotypic, but in 2009 a closely related new species was described, the Rubeho warbler.

Alternatively, Winifred's warbler has sometimes been included in the genus Bathmocercus with which it forms a clade that is a sister of the genus Cisticola. It is endemic to montane forest in the Uluguru Mountains in Tanzania. Populations in the Rubeho-Ukaguru Mountains are the very similar Rubeho warbler. The status is listed as near threatened, due to habitat loss.

References

Winifred's warbler
Endemic birds of Tanzania
Winifred's warbler
Taxonomy articles created by Polbot